Rodney Local Board is one of the 21 local boards of Auckland Council, and is administered by the ward councillor representing Rodney Ward. Located in the northern part of the Auckland region, it is named after the former Rodney District which existed before its amalgamation into Auckland Council in 2010. Nine elected Local Board members sit on the board.

The Rodney Local Board is charged with decision-making on local issues, activities, and services, and provide input into regional strategies, policies, plans, and decisions.

Governance
The ward is divided into four parts, each containing a number of towns and settlements:
 Kumeu subdivision: Kumeu, Helensville, Muriwai, Kaukapakapa and South Head
 Dairy Flat subdivision: Dairy Flat, Coatesville, Wainui and Waitoki
 Warkworth subdivision: Warkworth, Matakana, Leigh, Puhoi, Ahuroa, Kawau Island
 Wellsford subdivision: Wellsford, Te Arai, Pakiri, Port Albert, Tapora

Demographics

2022 local elections

Geoff Upson, (no afilliation) (Kumeu) 5340 Votes
Tim Holdgate, Independent (Warkworth) 4696 Votes
Guy Wishart, Rodney First (Kumeu) 3978 Votes
Brent Bailey, Chair. Rodney First (Kumeu) 3708 Votes
Mark Dennis, Rodney First (Kumeu) 3467 Votes
Ivan Wagstaff, Rodney First (Warkworth) 3346 Votes
Michelle Lisa Carmichael, Independent (Warkworth) 3143 Votes
Colin Smith, Independent (Wellsford) 1,303 votes
Louise Johnston, Deputy Chair. Rodney First (Dairy Flat) elected unopposed

2019 local elections

Phelan Pirrie, Chair. Rodney First (Kumeu) 5790 Votes
Beth Houlbrooke, Deputy Chair. Rodney First (Warkworth) 4993 Votes
Brent Bailey, Rodney First (Kumeu) 4520 Votes
Danielle Hancock, Rodney First (Kumeu) 4134 Votes
Vicki Kenny, Rodney First (Kumeu) 4089 Votes
Tim Holdgate, Independent (Warkworth) 3782 Votes
Steven Garner, Rodney Now (Warkworth) 3184 Votes
Colin Smith, Independent (Wellsford) elected unopposed
Louise Johnston, Rodney First (Dairy Flat) elected unopposed

2016 local elections

Phelan Pirrie, Rodney First, Deputy Chair (Kumeu) 4873 Votes
Cameron Brewer, Rodney First, (Kumeu) 4018 Votes
Allison Roe, Rodney First, (Warkworth) 3969 Votes
Tessa Berger, Independent (Warkworth) 3935 Votes
Brenda Steele, Independent (Kumeu) 3922 Votes
Brent Bailey, Rodney First (Kumeu) 3518 Votes
Beth Houlbrooke, Rodney First, Chair (Warkworth) 3230 Votes
Louise Johnston, Independent (Dairy Flat) 906 Votes
Colin Smith, Independent (Wellsford)

2013 local elections
The members elected in the 2013 local body elections:
Brenda Steele, Chair (Kumeu) 3045 Votes
Steven Garner, Deputy Chair(Warkworth) 2723 Votes
Thomas Grace (Kumeu) 2587 Votes
Phelan Pirrie (Kumeu) 2557 Votes
Warren Flauntey (Kumeu) 2512 Votes
Beth Houlbrooke (Warkworth) 2323 Votes
Greg Sayers (Warkworth) 1837 Votes
John McClean (Dairy Flat) 683 Votes
James Colville (Wellsford) 534 Votes

2010 local elections
The members elected in the 2010 local body elections:
Bob Howard, Chair (Kumeu) 3503 Votes
Warren Flauntey (Kumeu) 3575 Votes
Brenda Steele (Kumeu) 3349 Votes
Thomas Grace (Kumeu) 3388 Votes
John McClean (Dairy Flat) 836 Votes
Steven Garner (Warkworth) 3809 Votes
June Turner (Warkworth) 3533 Votes
Tracey Martin (Warkworth) 3610 Votes
James Rolf (replaced by James Colville before term ended) (Wellsford)

References

Rodney Local Board Area
Local boards of the Auckland Region